United National Front may refer to:

 United National Front (Afghanistan)
 United National Front (Pakistan)
 United National Front (Sri Lanka)
 United National Front (Singapore), a political party in Singapore